John Ireland (baptized September 11, 1838 – September 25, 1918) was an American religious leader who was the third Roman Catholic bishop and first Roman Catholic archbishop of Saint Paul, Minnesota (1888–1918). He became both a religious as well as civic leader in Saint Paul during the turn of the 20th century. Ireland was known for his progressive stance on education, immigration and relations between church and state, as well as his opposition to saloons and political corruption. He promoted the Americanization of Catholicism, especially in the furtherance of progressive social ideals.  He was a leader of the modernizing element in the Roman Catholic Church during the Progressive Era. He created or helped to create many religious  and educational institutions in Minnesota. He is also remembered for his acrimonious relations with Eastern Catholics.

History

John Ireland was born in Burnchurch, County Kilkenny, Ireland, and was baptized on September 11, 1838. He was the second of seven children born to Richard Ireland, a carpenter, and his second wife, Judith Naughton. His family immigrated to the United States in 1848 and eventually moved to Saint Paul, Minnesota, in 1852. One year later Joseph Crétin, first bishop of Saint Paul, sent Ireland to the preparatory seminary of Meximieux in France. Ireland was consequently ordained in 1861 in Saint Paul. He served as a chaplain of the Fifth Minnesota Regiment in the Civil War until 1863 when ill health caused his resignation.  Later, he was famous nationwide in the Grand Army of the Republic.

He was appointed pastor at Saint Paul's cathedral in 1867, a position which he held until 1875. In 1875, he was made coadjutor bishop of St. Paul and in 1884 he became bishop ordinary. In 1888 he became archbishop with the elevation of his diocese and the erection of the ecclesiastical province of Saint Paul. Ireland retained this title for 30 years until his death in 1918. Before Ireland died he burned all his personal papers.

Ireland was personal friends with Presidents William McKinley and Theodore Roosevelt.  At a time when most Irish Catholics were staunch Democrats, Ireland was known for being close to the Republican party.  He opposed racial inequality and called for "equal rights and equal privileges, political, civil, and social." 
Ireland's funeral was attended by eight archbishops, thirty bishops, twelve monsignors, seven hundred priests and two hundred seminarians.

He was awarded an honorary doctorate (LL.D.) by Yale University in October 1901, during celebrations for the bicentenary of the university.

A friend of James J. Hill, whose wife Mary was Catholic (even though Hill was not), Archbishop Ireland had his portrait painted in 1895 by the Swiss-born American portrait painter Adolfo Müller-Ury almost certainly on Hill's behalf, which was exhibited at M. Knoedler & Co., New York, January 1895 (lost) and again in 1897 (Archdiocesan Archives, Archdiocese of Saint Paul & Minneapolis).

Legacy
The influence of his personality made Archbishop Ireland a commanding figure in many important movements, especially those for total abstinence, for colonization in the Northwest, and modern education. Ireland became a leading civic and religious leader during the late 19th and early 20th centuries in Saint Paul.  He worked closely with non-Catholics and was recognized by them as a leader of the modernizing Catholics.

 
Ireland called for racial equality at a time in the U.S. when the concept was considered extreme. On May 5, 1890, he gave a sermon at St. Augustine's Church, in Washington, D.C., the center of an African-American parish, to a congregation that included several public officials, Congressmen including the full Minnesota delegation, U.S. Treasury Secretary William Windom, and Blanche Bruce, the second black U.S. Senator. Ireland's sermon on racial justice concluded with the statement, "The color line must go; the line will be drawn at personal merit." It was reported that "the bold and outspoken stand of the Archbishop on this occasion created somewhat of a sensation throughout America."

Colonization

Disturbed by reports that Catholic immigrants in eastern cities were suffering from social and economic handicaps, Ireland and Bishop John Lancaster Spalding of the Diocese of Peoria, Illinois, founded the Irish Catholic Colonization Association. This organization bought land in rural areas to the west and south and helped resettle Irish Catholics from the urban slums.
Ireland helped establish many Irish Catholic colonies in Minnesota. The land had been cleared of its native Sioux following the Dakota War of 1862. He served as director of the National Colonization Association.

His partner in Ireland was John Sweetman, a wealthy brewer who helped set up the Irish-American Colonisation Company there.

In 1880 Ireland assisted several hundred people from Connemara in Ireland to emigrate to Minnesota. They arrived at the wrong time of the year and had to be assisted by local Freemasons, an organisation that the Catholic Church condemns on many points. In the public debate that followed, the immigrants, being Gaelic speakers, could not voice their opinions of Bishop Ireland's criticism of their acceptance of the Masons' support during a harsh winter. De Graff and Clontarf in Swift County, Adrian in Nobles County, Avoca, Iona and Fulda in Murray County, Graceville in Big Stone County and Ghent in Lyon County were all colonies established by Ireland.

Charlotte Grace O'Brien, philanthropist and activist for the protection of female emigrants, found that often the illiterate young women were being tricked into prostitution through spurious offers of employment. She proposed an information bureau at Castle Garden, the disembarkation point for immigrants arriving in New York; a temporary shelter to provide accommodation for immigrants, and a chapel, all to Archbishop Ireland, whom she believed of all the American hierarchy would be most sympathetic. Ireland agreed to raise the matter at the May 1883 meeting of the Irish Catholic Association which endorsed the plan and voted to establish an information bureau at Castle Garden. The Irish Catholic Colonization Association was also instrumental in the establishment of the Mission of Our Lady of the Rosary for the Protection of Irish Immigrant Girls.

Education

Ireland advocated state support and inspection of Catholic schools. After several parochial schools were in danger of closing, Ireland sold them to the respective city's board of education. The schools continued to operate with nuns and priests teaching, but no religious teaching was allowed. This plan, the Faribault–Stillwater plan, or Poughkeepsie plan, created enough controversy that Ireland was forced to travel to Vatican City to defend it, and he succeeded in doing so. He also opposed the use of foreign languages in American Catholic churches and parochial schools. The use of foreign languages was not uncommon at the time because of the recent large influx of immigrants to the U.S. from European countries. Ireland influenced American society by actively promoting the use of the English language by large numbers of German immigrants. He is the author of The Church and Modern Society (1897).

Relations with Eastern Catholics

In 1891, Ireland refused to accept the clerical credentials of Byzantine Rite, Ruthenian Catholic priest Alexis Toth, despite Toth's being a widower. Ireland then forbade Toth to minister to his own parishioners, despite the fact that Toth had jurisdiction from his own bishop and did not answer to Ireland. Ireland was also involved in efforts to expel all non-Latin Church Catholic clergy from the United States. Forced into an impasse, Toth went on to lead thousands of Ruthenian Catholics out of the Roman Communion and into what would eventually become the Orthodox Church in America. Because of this, Archbishop Ireland is sometimes referred to, ironically, as "The Father of the Orthodox Church in America". Marvin R. O'Connell, author of a biography of Ireland, summarizes the situation by stating that "if Ireland's advocacy of the blacks displayed him at his best, his belligerence toward the Uniates showed him at his bull-headed worst."

Establishments

At the Third Plenary Council of Baltimore the establishment of a Catholic university was decided. In 1885 Ireland was appointed to a committee, along with, Bishop John Lancaster Spalding, Cardinal James Gibbons and then bishop John Joseph Keane dedicated to developing and establishing The Catholic University of America in Washington, D.C. Ireland retained an active interest in the University for the rest of his life.

He founded Saint Thomas Aquinas Seminary, progenitor of four institutions: University of Saint Thomas (Minnesota), the Saint Paul Seminary School of Divinity, Nazareth Hall Preparatory Seminary, and Saint Thomas Academy. The Saint Paul Seminary was established with the help of Methodist James J. Hill, whose wife, Mary Mehegan, was a devout Catholic. Both institutions are located on the bluffs overlooking the Mississippi River. DeLaSalle High School located on Nicollet Island in Minneapolis was opened in October 1900 through a gift of $25,000 from Ireland. Fourteen years later Ireland purchased an adjacent property for the expanding Christian Brothers school.

In 1904 Ireland secured the land for the building of the current Cathedral of Saint Paul located atop Summit Hill, the highest point in downtown Saint Paul. At the same time, on Christmas Day 1903 he also commissioned the construction of the almost equally large Church of Saint Mary, for the Immaculate Conception parish in the neighboring city of Minneapolis. It became the Pro-Cathedral of Minneapolis and later became the Basilica of Saint Mary, the first basilica in the United States in 1926. Both were designed and built under the direction of the French architect Emmanuel Louis Masqueray.

John Ireland Boulevard, a Saint Paul street that runs from the Cathedral of Saint Paul northeast to the Minnesota State Capitol, is named in his honor. It was so named in 1961 at the encouragement of the Ancient Order of Hibernians.

References

Further reading

 

 . Pages 143-144

External links

 
 
Bio
Ireland, John (1838-1918), MNopedia.
The Church and Modern Society on Internet Archive

Bishop Ireland's Connemara Experiment: Minnesota Historical Society

1838 births
1918 deaths
History of Saint Paul, Minnesota
Irish emigrants to the United States (before 1923)
People from County Kilkenny
Roman Catholic bishops of Saint Paul
Roman Catholic archbishops of Saint Paul
19th-century Roman Catholic archbishops in the United States
20th-century Roman Catholic archbishops in the United States
Union Army chaplains
19th-century Irish people
University of St. Thomas (Minnesota)